Kulun Beg - was a Turkic (Göktürk) ruler who tried to sustain the Second Turkic Khaganate in vain.

Family 
He succeeded Özmiş Khagan who was beheaded by the Ashina Shi. His relation to Özmiş Khagan is unclear. According to Taşağıl   he was Özmiş Khagan's son and according to the family tree drawn by Gumilev he was Özmiş Khagan's brother.

Reign 
He was enthroned in 744. When he was enthroned the Central Asian steppes were already conquered by the coalition of Uighur - Basmyl and Karluk. Chinese emperor Xuanzong decided to destroy the last traces of Turkic khaganate and he sent general Wang Zhongsi (王忠嗣) over Kulun Beg’s forces. Meanwhile Ashina Shi was deposed by Kutlug I Bilge Qaghan. Wang Zhongsi (王忠嗣) defeated the eastern flank of Turkic army headed by Apa Tarkhan. Although Kulun Beg tried to escape, he was arrested by the Uighurs and was beheaded just like his father in 745.

Aftermath
Most of the Turks fled to other Turkic tribes like Basmyl. However, a group including Po Beg, Bilge Khagan’s widow who was also Tonyukuk’s daughter, took refuge in China. Chinese emperor legitimised her as a princess and she was appointed as the ruler of her people. According to Taşağıl, Turks were mentioned in Chinese chronicles up to 941.

References 

Göktürk khagans
8th-century Turkic people
745 deaths
Year of birth unknown